The broadnose chimaera, knifenose chimaera, spearnose chimaera, or straightnose rabbitfish (Rhinochimaera atlantica) is a species of fish in the family Rhinochimaeridae found near Canada, Colombia, France, Gambia, Iceland, Mauritania, Mexico, Namibia, Senegal, South Africa, Suriname, and the United States. Its natural habitat is open seas.

References

Rhinochimaera
Taxonomy articles created by Polbot
Fish described in 1909